Edward Gough Whitlam  (11 July 191621 October 2014) was the 21st prime minister of Australia, serving from 1972 to 1975. The longest-serving federal leader of the Australian Labor Party (ALP) from 1967 to 1977, he was notable for being the head of a reformist and socially progressive administration that extraordinarily ended with his removal as prime minister after controversially being dismissed by the governor-general of Australia, Sir John Kerr, at the climax of the 1975 Australian constitutional crisis. Whitlam is the only Australian prime minister to have been removed from office.

Whitlam was an air navigator in the Royal Australian Air Force for four years during World War II, and worked as a barrister following the war. He was first elected to the Australian House of Representatives in 1952, becoming a member of parliament (MP) for the division of Werriwa. Whitlam became deputy leader of the Labor Party in 1960, and in 1967, after the retirement of Arthur Calwell, was elected leader of the party and became the Leader of the Opposition. After narrowly losing the 1969 federal election to John Gorton, Whitlam led Labor to victory at the 1972 election, after 23 years of continuous Coalition government. 

The Whitlam Government implemented a large number of new programmes and policy changes, including the termination of military conscription, institution of universal health care and free university education, and the implementation of legal aid programmes. With the opposition-controlled Australian Senate delaying passage of bills, Whitlam called a double dissolution election in 1974 in which he won a slightly reduced majority in the House of Representatives, and picked up three Senate seats to hold equal Senate numbers to the opposition. The Whitlam government then instituted the first and only joint sitting enabled under section 57 of the Australian constitution as part of the double dissolution process. Despite the government's second election victory, the opposition, reacting to government scandals and a declining economy suffering from the 1973 oil crisis and the 1973–1975 global recession, continued to obstruct the government's programme in the Senate. 

In late 1975, the opposition senators refused to allow a vote on the government's appropriation bills, returning them to the House of Representatives with a demand that the government go to an election, thus denying the government supply. Whitlam refused to agree to the request, arguing that his government, which held a clear majority in the House of Representatives, was being held to ransom by the Senate. The crisis ended in mid-November, when governor-general Sir John Kerr dismissed him from office and commissioned the opposition leader, Malcolm Fraser, as caretaker prime minister. Labor lost the subsequent election by a landslide. Whitlam stepped down as leader of the party after losing again at the 1977 election, and retired from parliament the following year. Upon the election of the Hawke Government in 1983, he was appointed as Ambassador to UNESCO, a position he filled with distinction, and was elected a member of the UNESCO Executive Board. He remained active into his nineties. The propriety and circumstances of his dismissal and the legacy of his government have been frequently debated in the decades since he left office. Nevertheless, journalist Paul Kelly said that "there is no doubt that in three years his government was responsible for more reforms and innovations than any other government in Australian history".

Early life

Edward Gough Whitlam was born on 11 July 1916 at the family home 'Ngara', 46 Rowland Street, Kew, a suburb of Melbourne, the elder of two children (his sister, Freda, was born four years after him), to Martha (née Maddocks) and Fred Whitlam. His father was a federal public servant who later was Commonwealth Crown Solicitor, and Whitlam senior's involvement in human rights issues was a powerful influence on his son. Since his maternal grandfather was also named Edward, from early childhood he was called by his middle name, Gough, which in turn had come from his paternal grandfather who had been named after the British soldier Field-Marshal Hugh Gough, 1st Viscount Gough.

In 1918, Fred Whitlam was promoted to deputy Crown solicitor and transferred to Sydney. The family lived first in the North Shore suburb of Mosman and then in Turramurra. At age six, Gough began his education at Chatswood Church of England Girls' School (early primary schooling at a girls' school was not unusual for small boys at the time). After a year there, he attended Mowbray House School and Knox Grammar School in the suburbs of Sydney.

Fred Whitlam was promoted again in 1927, this time to Assistant Crown Solicitor. The position was located in the new national capital of Canberra, and the Whitlam family moved there. As of 2008, Whitlam was the only prime minister to have spent his formative years in Canberra. At the time, conditions remained primitive in what was dubbed "the bush capital" and "the land of the blowflies". Gough attended the government Telopea Park School. In 1932, Whitlam's father transferred him to Canberra Grammar School where, at the Speech Day ceremony that year, he was awarded a prize by the Governor-General, Sir Isaac Isaacs.

Whitlam enrolled at St Paul's College at the University of Sydney at the age of 18. He earned his first wages by appearing, with several other "Paulines", in a cabaret scene in the film The Broken Melodythe students were chosen because St Paul's required formal wear at dinner, and they could therefore supply their own costumes. After receiving a Bachelor of Arts degree with second-class honours in classics, Whitlam remained at St Paul's to begin his law studies. He had originally contemplated an academic career, but his lacklustre marks made that unlikely. Dropping out of Greek classes, he professed himself unable to care for the "dry as dust" lectures of Enoch Powell.

Military service

Soon after the outbreak of World War II in 1939, Whitlam enlisted in the Sydney University Regiment, part of the Militia. In late 1941, following the Japanese attack on Pearl Harbor, and with a year remaining in his legal studies, he volunteered for the Royal Australian Air Force (RAAF). In 1942, while awaiting entry into the service, Whitlam met and married Margaret Elaine Dovey, who had swum for Australia in the 1938 British Empire Games and was the daughter of barrister and future New South Wales Supreme Court judge Bill Dovey. He entered the RAAF on 20 June 1942.

Whitlam trained as a navigator and bomb aimer, before serving with No. 13 Squadron RAAF, based mainly on the Gove Peninsula, Northern Territory, flying Lockheed Ventura bombers. He reached the rank of Flight Lieutenant. While in the service, he began his political activities, distributing literature for the Australian Labor Party during the 1943 federal election and urging the passage of the "Fourteen Powers" referendum of 1944, which would have expanded the powers of the federal government. Although the party was victorious, the referendum it advocated was defeated. In 1961, Whitlam said of the referendum defeat, "My hopes were dashed by the outcome and from that moment I determined to do all I could do to modernise the Australian Constitution." While still in uniform, Whitlam joined the ALP in Sydney in 1945. He was discharged from the RAAF on 17 October 1945, and continued to use Air Force log books to record all the flights he took until 2007. Whitlam completed his studies after the war, obtained his Bachelor of Laws, and was admitted to the federal and New South Wales bars in 1947.

Early political career, 1952–1967

Member of Parliament, 1952–1960

With his war service loan, Whitlam built a house in seaside Cronulla. He also bought the block of land next door, using the prize money (£1,000 in security bonds) he received for winning the Australian National Quiz Championship in 1948 and 1949 (he was runner-up in 1950). He sought to make a career in the ALP there, but local Labor supporters were sceptical of Whitlam's loyalties, given his privileged background. In the postwar years, he practised law, concentrating on landlord/tenant matters, and sought to build his bona fides in the party. He ran twiceunsuccessfullyfor the local council, once (also unsuccessfully) for the New South Wales Legislative Assembly, and campaigned for other candidates. In 1951, Bert Lazzarini, the Labor member for the Federal electorate of Werriwa, announced that he would stand down at the next election. Whitlam won the preselection as ALP candidate. Lazzarini died in 1952 before completing his term and Whitlam was elected to the House of Representatives in the ensuing by-election on 29 November 1952. Whitlam trebled Lazzarini's majority in a 12 per cent swing to Labor.

Whitlam joined the ALP minority in the House of Representatives. His maiden speech provoked an interruption by a future prime minister, John McEwen, who was then told by the Speaker that maiden speeches are traditionally heard in silence. Whitlam responded to McEwen by saying Benjamin Disraeli had been heckled in his maiden speech and had responded, "The time will come when you shall hear me." He told McEwen, "The time will come when you may interrupt me." According to early Whitlam biographers Laurie Oakes and David Solomon, this cool response put the Coalition government on notice that the new Member for Werriwa would be a force to be reckoned with.

In the rough and tumble debate in the House of Representatives, Whitlam called fellow MHR Bill Bourke "this grizzling Quisling", Garfield Barwick (who, as High Court Chief Justice, played a role in Whitlam's downfall) a "bumptious bastard", and he said Bill Wentworth exhibited a "hereditary streak of insanity". After calling future prime minister William McMahon a "quean", he apologised.

The ALP had been out of office since the Chifley Government's defeat in 1949 and, since 1951, had been under the leadership of Bert Evatt, whom Whitlam greatly admired. In 1954, the ALP seemed likely to return to power. The Prime Minister, Robert Menzies, adroitly used the defection of a Soviet official to his advantage, and his coalition of the Liberal and Country parties was returned in the 1954 election with a seven-seat majority. After the election, Evatt attempted to purge the party of industrial groupers, who had long dissented from party policy, and who were predominantly Catholic and anti-communist. The ensuing division in the ALP, which came to be known as "The Split", sparked the birth of the Democratic Labor Party (DLP). It was a conflict that helped to keep Labor out of power for a generation, since DLP supporters chose the Liberal Party in preferential voting. Whitlam supported Evatt throughout this period.

In 1955, a redistribution divided Whitlam's electorate of Werriwa in two, with his Cronulla home located in the new electorate of Hughes. Although Whitlam would have received ALP support in either division, he chose to continue standing for Werriwa and moved from Cronulla to Cabramatta. This meant even longer journeys for his older children to attend school, since neither electorate had a high school at the time, and they attended school in Sydney.

Whitlam was appointed to the Parliamentary Joint Committee on Constitutional Review in 1956. Biographer Jenny Hocking calls his service on the committee, which included members from all parties in both chambers of Parliament, one of the "great influences in his political development". According to Hocking, service on the committee caused Whitlam to focus not on internal conflicts consuming the ALP, but on Labor goals which were possible and worthwhile in the constitutional framework. Many Labor goals, such as nationalisation, ran contrary to the Constitution. Whitlam came to believe the Constitutionand especially Section 96 (which allowed the federal government to make grants to the states)could be used to advance a worthwhile Labor programme.

Deputy Leader, 1960–1967
By the late 1950s Whitlam was seen as a leadership contender once the existing Labor leaders exited the scene. Most of the party's major figures, including Evatt, Deputy Leader Arthur Calwell, Eddie Ward, and Reg Pollard, were in their sixties, twenty years older than Whitlam. In 1960, after losing three elections, Evatt resigned and was replaced by Calwell, with Whitlam defeating Ward for deputy leader. Calwell came within a handful of votes of winning the cliffhanger 1961 election. He had not wanted Whitlam as deputy leader, and believed Labor would have won if Ward had been in the position.

Soon after the 1961 election, events began to turn against Labor. When President Sukarno of Indonesia announced that he intended to take over West New Guinea as the colonial Dutch departed, Calwell responded by declaring that Indonesia must be stopped by force. Calwell's statement was called "crazy and irresponsible" by Prime Minister Menzies, and the incident reduced public support for the ALP. At that time, the Federal Conference of the Labor Party, which dictated policy to parliamentary members, consisted of six members from each state, but not Calwell or Whitlam. In early 1963 a special conference met in a Canberra hotel to determine Labor policy regarding a proposed US base in northern Australia; Calwell and Whitlam were photographed by The Daily Telegraph peering in through the doors, waiting for the verdict. In an accompanying story, Alan Reid of the Telegraph wrote that Labor was ruled by "36 faceless men". The Liberals seized on it, issuing a leaflet called "Mr Calwell and the Faceless Men" which accused Calwell and Whitlam of taking direction from "36 unknown men, not elected to Parliament nor responsible to the people".

Menzies manipulated the Opposition on issues that bitterly divided it, such as direct aid to the states for private schools, and the proposed base. He called an early election for November 1963, standing in support of those two issues. The Prime Minister performed better than Calwell on television and received an unexpected boost after the assassination of US President John F. Kennedy. As a result, the Coalition easily defeated Labor on a 10-seat swing. Whitlam had hoped Calwell would step down after 1963, but he remained, reasoning that Evatt had been given three opportunities to win, and that he should be allowed a third try. Calwell dismissed proposals that the ALP leader and deputy leader should be entitled to membership of the party's conference (or on its governing 12-person Federal Executive, which had two representatives from each state), and instead ran successfully for one of the conference's Victoria seats. Labor did badly in a 1964 by-election in the Tasmanian electorate of Denison, and lost seats in the 1964 half-Senate election. The party was also defeated in the state elections in the most populous state, New South Wales, surrendering control of the state government for the first time since 1941.

Whitlam's relationship with Calwell, never good, deteriorated further after publication of a 1965 article in The Australian. The article reported off-the-record comments Whitlam had made that his leader was "too old and weak" to win office, and that the party might be gravely damaged by an "old-fashioned" 70-year-old Calwell seeking his first term as prime minister. Later that year, at Whitlam's and Don Dunstan's urging, and over Calwell's objection, the biennial party conference made major changes to the party's platform: deleting support for the White Australia policy and making the ALP's leader and deputy leader ex officio members of the conference and executive, along with the party's leader and deputy leader in the Senate. As Whitlam considered the Senate unrepresentative, he opposed the admission of its ALP leaders to the party's governing bodies.

Menzies retired in January 1966, and was succeeded as prime minister by the new Liberal Party leader, Harold Holt. After years of politics being dominated by the elderly Menzies and Calwell, the younger Holt was seen as a breath of fresh air, and attracted public interest and support in the run-up to the November election.

In early 1966, the 36-member conference, with Calwell's assent, banned any ALP parliamentarian from supporting federal assistance to the states for spending on both government and private schools, commonly called "state aid". Whitlam broke with the party on the issue, and was charged with gross disloyalty by the executive, an offence which carried the penalty of expulsion from the party. Before the matter could be heard, Whitlam left for Queensland, where he campaigned intensively for the ALP candidate Rex Patterson in the Dawson by-election. The ALP won, dealing the government its first by-election defeat since 1952. Whitlam survived the expulsion vote by a margin of only two, gaining both Queensland votes. At the end of April, Whitlam challenged Calwell for the leadership; though Calwell received two-thirds of the vote, he announced that if the party lost the upcoming election, he would not stand again for the leadership.

Holt called an election for November 1966, in which Australia's involvement in the Vietnam War was a major issue. Calwell called for an "immediate and unconditional withdrawal" of Australian troops from Vietnam. Whitlam, however, said this would deprive Australia of any voice in a settlement, and that regular troops, rather than conscripts, should remain under some circumstances. Calwell considered Whitlam's remark disastrous, disputing the party line just five days before the election. The ALP suffered a crushing defeat; the party was reduced to 41 seats in the House of Representatives. Shortly after the election, Whitlam faced another expulsion vote for his stance on Vietnam, and survived. True to his word, Calwell resigned two months after the election. At the caucus meeting on 8February 1967, Whitlam was elected party leader, defeating leading left-wing candidate Dr Jim Cairns.

Leader of the Opposition, 1967–1972

Reforming the ALP

Whitlam believed the Labor Party had little chance of being elected unless it could expand its appeal from the traditional working-class base to include the suburban middle class. He sought to shift control of the ALP from union officials to the parliamentary party, and hoped even rank-and-file party members could be given a voice in the conference. In 1968, controversy erupted within the party when the executive refused to seat new Tasmanian delegate Brian Harradine, a Whitlam supporter who was considered a right-wing extremist. Whitlam resigned the leadership, demanding a vote of confidence from caucus. He defeated Cairns for the leadership in an unexpectedly close 38–32 vote. Despite the vote, the executive refused to seat Harradine.

With the ALP's governing bodies unwilling to reform themselves, Whitlam worked to build support for change among ordinary party members. He was successful in reducing union influence in the party, though he was never able to give the rank and file a direct vote in selecting the executive. The Victoria branch of the party had long been a problem; its executive was far to the left of the rest of the ALP, and had little electoral success. Whitlam was able to reconstruct the Victoria party organisation against the will of its leaders, and the reconstituted state party proved essential to victory in the 1972 election.

By the time of the 1969 party conference, Whitlam had gained considerable control over the ALP. That conference passed 61 resolutions, including broad changes to party policy and procedures. It called for the establishment of an Australian Schools Commission to consider the proper level of state aid for schools and universities, recognition of Aboriginal land claims, and expanded party policy on universal health care. The conference also called for increased federal involvement in urban planning, and formed the basis of "The Program" of modern socialism which Whitlam and the ALP presented to the voters in 1972.

Since 1918, Labor had called for the abolition of the existing Australian Constitution, and the vesting of all political power in Parliament, a plan which would turn the states into powerless geographic regions. Beginning in 1965, Whitlam sought to change this goal. He finally succeeded at the 1971 ALP Conference in Launceston, Tasmania, which called for Parliament to receive "such plenary powers as are necessary and desirable" to achieve the ALP's goals in domestic and international affairs. Labor also pledged to abolish the Senate; this goal was not erased from the party platform until 1979, after Whitlam had stepped down as leader.

Leader of the Opposition

Soon after taking the leadership, Whitlam reorganised the ALP caucus, assigning portfolios and turning the Labor frontbench into a shadow cabinet. While the Liberal-Country Coalition had a huge majority in the House of Representatives, Whitlam energised the party by campaigning intensively to win two by-elections in 1967: first in Corio in Victoria, and later that year in Capricornia in Queensland. The November half-Senate election saw a moderate swing to Labor and against the Coalition, compared with the general election the previous year. These federal victories, in which both Whitlam and Holt campaigned, helped give Whitlam the leverage he needed to carry out party reforms.

At the end of 1967, Holt vanished while swimming in rough seas near Melbourne; his body was never recovered. John McEwen, as leader of the junior Coalition partner, the Country Party, took over as prime minister for three weeks until the Liberals could elect a new leader. Senator John Gorton won the vote and became prime minister. The leadership campaign was conducted mostly by television, and Gorton appeared to have the visual appeal needed to keep Whitlam out of office. Gorton resigned his seat in the Senate, and in February 1968 won the by-election for Holt's seat of Higgins in Victoria. For the remainder of the year, Gorton appeared to have the better of Whitlam in the House of Representatives. In his chronicle of the Whitlam years, however, speechwriter Graham Freudenberg asserts that Gorton's erratic behaviour, Whitlam's strengthening of his party, and events outside Australia (such as the Vietnam War) ate away at Liberal dominance.

Gorton called an election for October 1969. Whitlam and the ALP, with little internal dissension, stood on a platform calling for domestic reform, an end to conscription, and the withdrawal of Australian troops from Vietnam by 1July 1970. Whitlam knew that, given the ALP's poor position after the 1966 election, victory was unlikely. Nevertheless, Whitlam scored an 18-seat swing, Labor's best performance since losing government in 1949. It also scored a 7.1 per cent two-party swing, the largest to not result in a change of government. Although the Coalition was returned for an eighth term in government, it was with a slim majority of three seats, down from 19 prior to the election. Labor actually won a bare majority of the two-party vote and only DLP preferences, especially in Melbourne-area seats, kept Whitlam from becoming prime minister. The 1970 half-Senate election brought little change to Coalition control, but the Coalition vote fell below 40 per cent for the first time, representing a severe threat to Gorton's leadership.

In March 1971, the resentment against Gorton came to a head when a confidence vote in the Liberal caucus resulted in a tie. Declaring that this was a sign he no longer had the confidence of the party, Gorton resigned, and William McMahon was elected his successor. With the Liberals in turmoil, Whitlam and the ALP sought to gain public trust as a credible government-in-waiting. The party's actions, such as its abandonment of the White Australia policy, gained favourable media attention. The Labor leader flew to Papua New Guinea and pledged himself to the independence of what was then under Australian trusteeship. In 1971, Whitlam flew to Beijing and met with Chinese officials, including Zhou Enlai. McMahon attacked Whitlam for the visit and claimed that the Chinese had manipulated him. This attack backfired when US President Richard Nixon announced that he would visit China the following year. His National Security Advisor, Henry Kissinger, visited Beijing between 9–11 July (less than a week after Whitlam's visit of 4–6 July), and, unknown to Whitlam, some of Kissinger's staff had been in Beijing preparing for Kissinger's visit at the same time as the Labor delegation. According to Whitlam biographer Jenny Hocking, the incident transformed Whitlam into an international statesman, while McMahon was seen as reacting defensively to Whitlam's foreign policy ventures. Other errors by McMahon, such as a confused ad-lib speech while visiting Washington, and a statement to Indonesia's President Suharto that Australia was a "west European nation", also damaged the government.

By early 1972, Labor had established a clear lead in the polls; indeed, for the first time since 1955 its support was greater than the combined vote for the Coalition and DLP. Unemployment was at a ten-year peak, rising to 2.14 per cent in August (though the unemployment rate was calculated differently compared to the present, and did not include thousands of rural workers on Commonwealth-financed relief work). Inflation was also at its highest rate since the early 1950s. The government recovered slightly in the August Budget session of Parliament, proposing income tax cuts and increased spending. The Labor strategy for the run-up to the election was to sit back and allow the Coalition to make mistakes. Whitlam controversially stated in March "draft-dodging is not a crime" and that he would be open to a revaluation of the Australian dollar. With the Coalition sinking in the polls and his own personal approval ratings down as low as 28 per cent, McMahon waited as long as he could, finally calling an election for the House of Representatives for 2December. Whitlam noted that the polling day was the anniversary of the Battle of Austerlitz at which another "ramshackle, reactionary coalition" had been given a "crushing defeat".

Labor campaigned under the slogan "It's Time", an echo of Menzies' successful 1949 slogan, "It's Time for a Change". Surveys showed that even Liberal voters approved of the Labor slogan. Whitlam pledged an end to conscription and the release of individuals who had refused the draft; an income tax surcharge to pay for universal health insurance; free dental care for students; and renovation of ageing urban infrastructure. The party pledged to eliminate university tuition fees and establish a schools commission to evaluate educational needs. The party benefited from the support of the proprietor of News Limited, Rupert Murdoch, who preferred Whitlam over McMahon. Labor was so dominant in the campaign that some of Whitlam's advisers urged him to stop joking about McMahon; people were feeling sorry for him. The election saw the ALP increase its tally by 12 seats, mostly in suburban Sydney and Melbourne, for a majority of nine in the House of Representatives. The ALP gained little beyond the suburban belts, however, losing a seat in South Australia and two in Western Australia.

Prime Minister, 1972–1975

First term

Duumvirate

Whitlam took office with a majority in the House of Representatives, but without control of the Senate (elected in the 1967 and 1970 half-elections). The Senate at that time consisted of ten members from each of the six states, elected by single transferable vote. Historically, when Labor won government, the parliamentary caucus chose the ministers, with the party leader having the power only to assign portfolios. However, the new Labor caucus would not meet until after the final results came in on 15 December. 

With Labor's win beyond doubt even though counting was still underway, McMahon advised the Governor-General, Sir Paul Hasluck, that he was no longer in a position to govern. Soon afterward, Whitlam advised Hasluck that he could form a government with his new majority. This was in accordance with longstanding Australian constitutional practice. Convention also held that McMahon would stay on as caretaker prime minister until the full results were in. However, Whitlam was unwilling to wait that long. On 5December, per Whitlam's request, Hasluck swore Whitlam and Labor's deputy leader, Lance Barnard, as an interim two-man government, with Whitlam as prime minister and Barnard as deputy prime minister. The two men held 27 portfolios during the two weeks before a full cabinet could be determined.

During the two weeks the so-called "duumvirate" held office, Whitlam sought to fulfill those campaign promises that did not require legislation. Whitlam ordered negotiations to establish full relations with the People's Republic of China, and broke those with Taiwan. The diplomatic relations were  established in 1972 and an embassy opened in Beijing in 1973. Legislation allowed the defence minister to grant exemptions from conscription. Barnard held this office, and exempted everyone. Seven men were at that time incarcerated for refusing conscription; Whitlam arranged for their liberation. The Whitlam government in its first days reopened the equal pay case pending before the Commonwealth Conciliation and Arbitration Commission, and appointed a woman, Elizabeth Evatt, to the commission. Whitlam and Barnard eliminated sales tax on contraceptive pills, announced major grants for the arts, and appointed an interim schools commission. The duumvirate barred racially discriminatory sports teams from Australia, and instructed the Australian delegation at the United Nations to vote in favour of sanctions on apartheid South Africa and Rhodesia. It also ordered the Australian Army Training Team home from Vietnam, ending Australia's involvement in the war; most troops, including all conscripts, had been withdrawn by McMahon. According to Whitlam's speechwriter Graham Freudenberg, the duumvirate was a success, as it showed that the Labor government could manipulate the machinery of government, despite almost a quarter-century in opposition. However, Freudenberg noted that the rapid pace and public excitement caused by the duumvirate's actions caused the Opposition to be wary of giving Labor too easy a time, and gave rise to one post-mortem assessment of the Whitlam government: "We did too much too soon."

Enacting a program

The McMahon government had consisted of 27 ministers, twelve of whom comprised the Cabinet. In the run-up to the election, the Labor caucus had decided that if the party took power all 27 ministers were to be Cabinet members. Intense canvassing took place amongst ALP parliamentarians as the duumvirate did its work, and on 18 December the caucus elected the Cabinet. The results were generally acceptable to Whitlam, and within three hours, he had announced the portfolios of the Cabinet members. To give himself greater control over the Cabinet, in January 1973 Whitlam established five Cabinet committees (with the members appointed by himself, not the caucus) and took full control of the Cabinet agenda.

Whitlam, prime minister for fewer than three years between 1972 and 1975, pushed through a raft of reforms that radically changed Australia's economic, legal and cultural landscape.

The Whitlam government abolished the death penalty for federal crimes. Legal aid was established, with offices in each state capital. It abolished university fees, and established the Schools Commission to allocate funds to schools. Whitlam founded the Department of Urban Development and, having lived in developing Cabramatta, most of which lacked sewage facilities, established the National Sewerage Program, which set a goal to leave no urban home unsewered. The Whitlam government gave grants directly to local government units for urban renewal, flood prevention, and the promotion of tourism. Other federal grants financed highways linking the state capitals, and paid for standard-gauge rail lines between the states. The government attempted to set up a new city at Albury–Wodonga on the Victoria–New South Wales border. The process was started for "Advance Australia Fair" to become the country's national anthem in place of "God Save the Queen". The Order of Australia replaced the British honours system in early 1975.

In 1973, the National Gallery of Australia, then called the Australian National Gallery, bought the painting "Blue Poles" by contemporary artist Jackson Pollock for US$2million (A$1.3million at the time of payment), which was about a third of its annual budget. This required Whitlam's personal permission, which he gave on the condition the price was publicised. The purchase created a political and media scandal, and was said to symbolise, alternatively, Whitlam's foresight and vision or his profligate spending.

Whitlam travelled extensively as prime minister, and was the first Australian prime minister to visit China while in office. He was criticised for making this visit, especially after Cyclone Tracy struck Darwin; he interrupted an extensive tour of Europe for 48 hours (deemed too brief a period by many) to view the devastation.

Early troubles
From the start of the Whitlam government, the Opposition, led by Billy Snedden, who replaced McMahon as Liberal leader in December 1972, sought to use control of the Senate to baulk Whitlam. It did not seek to block all government legislation; the Coalition senators, led by Senate Liberal leader Reg Withers, sought to block government legislation only when the obstruction would advance the Opposition's agenda. The Whitlam government also had troubles in relations with the states. New South Wales refused the government's request to close the Rhodesian Information Centre in Sydney. The Queensland premier, Joh Bjelke-Petersen refused to consider any adjustment in Queensland's border with Papua New Guinea, which, due to the state's ownership of islands in the Torres Strait, came within half a kilometre of the Papuan mainland. Liberal state governments in New South Wales and Victoria were re-elected by large margins in 1973. Whitlam and his majority in the House of Representatives proposed a constitutional referendum in December 1973, transferring control of wages and prices from the states to the federal government. The two propositions failed to attract a majority of voters in any state, and were rejected by over 800,000 votes nationwide.

In 1974, the Senate refused to pass six bills after they were passed twice by the House of Representatives. With the Opposition threatening to disrupt money supply to government, Whitlam used the Senate's recalcitrance to trigger a double dissolution election, holding it instead of the half-Senate election. After a campaign featuring the Labor slogan "Give Gough a fair go", the Whitlam government was returned, with its majority in the House of Representatives cut from seven to five and its Senate seats increased by three. It was only the second time since Federation that a Labor government had been elected to a second full term. The government and the opposition each had 29 Senators with two seats held by independents. The deadlock over the twice-rejected bills was broken, uniquely in Australian history, with a special joint sitting of the two houses of Parliament under Section 57 of the Constitution. This session, authorised by the new governor-general, John Kerr, passed bills providing for universal health insurance (known then as Medibank, today as Medicare) and providing the Northern Territory and Australian Capital Territory with representation in the Senate, effective at the next election.

Murphy raids

In February 1973, the Attorney General, Senator Lionel Murphy, led a police raid on the Melbourne office of the Australian Security Intelligence Organisation, which was under his ministerial responsibility. Murphy believed that ASIO might have files relating to threats against Yugoslav Prime Minister Džemal Bijedić, who was about to visit Australia, and feared ASIO might conceal or destroy them. The Opposition attacked the Government over the raid, terming Murphy a "loose cannon". A Senate investigation of the incident was cut short when Parliament was dissolved in 1974. According to journalist and author Wallace Brown, the controversy over the raid continued to dog the Whitlam government throughout its term, because the incident was "so silly".

Gair Affair

By early 1974, the Senate had rejected nineteen government bills, ten of them twice. With a half-Senate election due by mid-year, Whitlam looked for ways to shore up support in that body. Queensland senator and former DLP leader Vince Gair signalled his willingness to leave the Senate for a diplomatic post. Gair's term would not expire until the following half-Senate election or upon a double dissolution election. With five Queensland seats at stake in the half-Senate election, the ALP was expected to win only two, but if six (including Gair's) were at stake, the party would be likely to win a third. Possible control of the Senate was therefore at stake; Whitlam agreed to Gair's request and had Governor-General Sir Paul Hasluck appoint him ambassador to Ireland. Word leaked of Gair's pending resignation, and Whitlam's opponents attempted to counteract his manoeuvre. On what became known as the "Night of the Long Prawns", Country Party members secreted Gair at a small party in a legislative office as the ALP searched for him to secure his written resignation. As Gair enjoyed beer and prawns, Bjelke-Petersen advised the Queensland governor, Colin Hannah, to issue writs for only the usual five vacancies, since Gair's seat was not yet vacant, effectively countering Whitlam's plan.

Second term
By mid-1974, Australia was in an economic slump, suffering from the 1973 oil crisis and 1973–1975 recession. The 1973 oil crisis had caused prices to spike and, according to government figures, inflation topped 13 per cent for over a year between 1973 and 1974. Part of the inflation was due to Whitlam's desire to increase wages and conditions of the Commonwealth Public Service as a pacesetter for the private sector. The Whitlam government had cut tariffs by 25 per cent in 1973; 1974 saw an increase in imports of 30 per cent and a $1.5billion increase in the trade deficit. Primary producers of commodities such as beef were caught in a credit squeeze as short-term rates rose to extremely high levels. Unemployment also rose significantly. Unease within the ALP led to Barnard's defeat when Jim Cairns challenged him for his deputy leadership. Whitlam gave little help to his embattled deputy, who had formed the other half of the duumvirate.

Despite these economic indicators, the Budget presented in August 1974 saw large increases in spending, especially in education. Treasury officials had advised a series of tax and fee increases, ranging from excise taxes to the cost of posting a letter; their advice was mostly rejected by Cabinet. The Budget was unsuccessful in dealing with the inflation and unemployment, and Whitlam introduced large tax cuts in November. He also announced additional spending to help the private sector.

Beginning in October 1974, the Whitlam government sought overseas loans to finance its development plans, with the newly enriched oil nations a likely target. Whitlam attempted to secure financing before informing the Loan Council which included state officials hostile to Whitlam. His government empowered Pakistani financier Tirath Khemlani as an intermediary in the hope of securing US$4billion in loans. While the Loans Affair did not result in a loan, according to author and Whitlam speechwriter Graham Freudenberg, "The only cost involved was the cost to the reputation of the Government. That cost was to be immenseit was government itself."

Whitlam appointed Senator Murphy to the High Court, even though Murphy's Senate seat would not be up for election if a half-Senate election were held. Labor then held three of the five short-term New South Wales Senate seats. Under proportional representation, Labor could hold its three short-term seats in the next half-Senate election but, if Murphy's seat were also contested, Labor was unlikely to win four out of six. Thus, a Murphy appointment meant the almost certain loss of a seat in the closely divided Senate at the next election. Whitlam appointed Murphy anyway. By convention, senators appointed by the state legislature to fill casual vacancies were from the same political party as the former senator. The New South Wales premier, Tom Lewis felt that this convention applied only to vacancies caused by deaths or ill-health, and arranged for the legislature to elect Cleaver Bunton, former mayor of Albury and an independent. By March 1975, many Liberal parliamentarians felt Snedden was doing an inadequate job as leader of the Opposition, and that Whitlam was dominating him in the House of Representatives. Malcolm Fraser challenged Snedden for the leadership, and defeated him on 21 March.

Soon after Fraser's accession, controversy arose over the Whitlam government's actions in trying to restart peace talks in Vietnam. As the North prepared to end the civil war, Whitlam sent cables to both Vietnamese governments, telling Parliament both cables were substantially the same. The Opposition contended he had misled Parliament, and a motion to censure Whitlam was defeated along party lines. The Opposition also attacked Whitlam for not allowing enough South Vietnamese refugees into Australia, with Fraser calling for the entry of 50,000. Freudenberg alleges that 1,026 Vietnamese refugees entered Australia in the final eight months of the Whitlam government, and only 399 in 1976 under Fraser. However, by 1977, Australia had accepted more than five thousand refugees.

As the political situation deteriorated, Whitlam and his government continued to enact legislation: The Family Law Act 1975 provided for no-fault divorce while the Racial Discrimination Act 1975 caused Australia to ratify the International Convention on the Elimination of All Forms of Racial Discrimination that Australia had signed under Holt, but which had never been ratified. In August 1975, Whitlam gave the Gurindji people of the Northern Territory title deeds to part of their traditional lands, beginning the process of Aboriginal land reform. The next month, Australia granted independence to Papua New Guinea.

Following the 1974 Carnation Revolution, Portugal began a process of decolonisation and began a withdrawal from Portuguese Timor (later East Timor). Australians had long taken an interest in the colony; the nation had sent troops to the region during World WarII, and many East Timorese had fought the Japanese as guerrillas. In September 1974, Whitlam met with President Suharto in Indonesia and indicated that he would support Indonesia if it annexed East Timor. At the height of the Cold War, and in the context of the American retreat from Indo-China, he felt that incorporation of East Timor into Indonesia would enhance the stability of the region, and reduce the risk of the East Timorese FRETILIN movement, which many feared was communist, coming to power.

Whitlam had offered Barnard a diplomatic post and in early 1975 Barnard agreed to this, triggering a by-election in his Tasmanian electorate of Bass. The election on 28 June proved a disaster for Labor, which lost the seat with a swing against it of 17 per cent. The next week, Whitlam removed deputy prime minister Cairns, who had misled Parliament about the Loans Affair amid controversy about his relationship with his office manager, Junie Morosi. At the time of Cairns's dismissal, one Senate seat was vacant, following the death on 30 June of Queensland ALP Senator Bertie Milliner. The state Labor party nominated Mal Colston, resulting in a deadlock. The unicameral Queensland legislature twice voted against Colston, and the party refused to submit any alternative candidates. Bjelke-Petersen finally convinced the legislature to elect a low-level union official, Albert Field, who had contacted his office and expressed a willingness to serve. In interviews, Field made it clear he would not support Whitlam. Field was expelled from the ALP for standing against Colston, and Labor senators boycotted his swearing-in. Whitlam argued that, because of the manner of filling vacancies, the Senate was "corrupted" and "tainted", with the Opposition enjoying a majority they did not win at the ballot box.

Dismissal

In October 1975, the Opposition, led by Malcolm Fraser, determined to withhold supply by deferring consideration of appropriation bills. With Field on leave (his Senate appointment having been challenged), the Coalition had an effective majority of 30–29 in the Senate. The Coalition believed that if Whitlam could not deliver supply, and would not advise new elections, Kerr would have to dismiss him. Supply would run out on 30 November.

The stakes were raised in the conflict on 10 October, when the High Court declared valid the Act granting the territories two senators each. In a half-Senate election, most successful candidates would not take their places until 1July 1976, but the territories' senators, and those filling Field's and Bunton's seats, would assume their seats immediately. This gave Labor an outside chance of controlling the Senate, at least until 1July 1976.

On 14 October, Labor minister Rex Connor, mastermind of the loans scheme, was forced to resign when Khemlani released documents showing that Connor had made misleading statements. The continuing scandal bolstered the Coalition in their stance that they would not concede supply. Whitlam on the other hand, convinced that he would win the battle, was glad of the distraction from the Loans Affair, and believed he would "smash" not only the Senate, but Fraser's leadership as well.

Whitlam told the House of Representatives on 21 October,

Whitlam and his ministers repeatedly claimed that the Opposition was damaging not only the constitution, but the economy as well. The Coalition senators remained united, though several became increasingly concerned about the tactic of blocking supply. As the crisis dragged into November, Whitlam attempted to make arrangements for public servants and suppliers to be able to cash cheques at banks. These transactions would be temporary loans which the government would repay once supply was restored. This plan to prolong government without supply was presented to Kerr unsigned on 6November, under the title "Draft Joint Opinion" (ostensibly of solicitor-general Maurice Byers and attorney-general Kep Enderby). It proposed that public employees, including members of the armed forces and police, "could assign arrears of pay by way of mortgage". The government's refusal to formalise this and other "advice" was a factor justifying Kerr's resort to advice from elsewhere.

Kerr was following the crisis closely. At a luncheon with Whitlam and several of his ministers on 30 October, Kerr suggested a compromise: if Fraser conceded supply, Whitlam would agree not to call the half-Senate election until May or June 1976, or alternatively would agree not to call the Senate into session until after 1July. Whitlam rejected the idea, seeking to end the Senate's right to deny supply. On 3November, after a meeting with Kerr, Fraser proposed that if the government agreed to hold a House of Representatives election at the same time as the half-Senate election, the Coalition would concede supply. Whitlam rejected this offer, stating that he had no intention of advising a House election for at least a year.

With the crisis unresolved, Kerr decided to dismiss Whitlam as prime minister. Fearing that Whitlam would go to the Queen and potentially have him removed, the Governor-General gave Whitlam no prior hint. Against Whitlam's advice, he conferred with High Court Chief Justice Sir Garfield Barwick, who agreed that he had the power to dismiss Whitlam.

A meeting among the party leaders, including Whitlam and Fraser, to resolve the crisis on the morning of 11 November came to nothing. Kerr and Whitlam met at the Governor-General's office that afternoon at 1:00pm. Unknown to Whitlam, Fraser was waiting in an ante-room; Whitlam later said he would not have set foot in the building if he had known Fraser was there. Whitlam, as he had told Kerr by phone earlier that day, came prepared to advise a half-Senate election, to be held on 13 December. Kerr instead told Whitlam he had terminated his commission as prime minister, and handed him a letter to that effect. After the conversation, Whitlam returned to the Prime Minister's residence, The Lodge, had lunch and conferred with his advisers. Immediately after his meeting with Whitlam, Kerr commissioned Fraser as caretaker Prime Minister, on the assurance he could obtain supply and would then advise Kerr to dissolve both houses for election.

In the confusion, Whitlam and his advisers did not immediately tell any Senate members of the dismissal, with the result that when the Senate convened at 2:00pm, the appropriation bills were rapidly passed, with the ALP senators assuming the Opposition had given in. The bills were soon sent to Kerr to receive Royal Assent. At 2:34pm, ten minutes after supply had been secured, Fraser rose in the House and announced he was prime minister. Whitlam immediately moved a successful no confidence motion against Fraser in the House. The Speaker, Gordon Scholes, was instructed to advise Kerr to reinstate Whitlam.

Kerr refused to receive Scholes, keeping him waiting for more than an hour. In that time Kerr rang Justice Anthony Mason to ask for advice. Mason told him the no confidence motion in the House was "irrelevant". Kerr then prorogued Parliament by proclamation: his Official Secretary, David Smith, came to Parliament House to proclaim the dissolution from the front steps. A large, angry crowd had gathered, and Smith was nearly drowned out by their noise. He concluded his task by taking the unilateral step of re-instating the traditional ending for a royal proclamation "God save the Queen", a practice the Whitlam government had abolished. Whitlam, who had been standing behind Smith, then addressed the crowd:
Well may we say "God save the Queen", because nothing will save the Governor-General! The Proclamation which you have just heard read by the Governor-General's Official Secretary was countersigned Malcolm Fraser, who will undoubtedly go down in Australian history from Remembrance Day 1975 as Kerr's cur. They won't silence the outskirts of Parliament House, even if the inside has been silenced for a few weeks.... Maintain your rage and enthusiasm for the campaign for the election now to be held and until polling day.

Alleged CIA involvement

During the crisis, Whitlam had alleged that National Country Party leader Doug Anthony had close links to the US Central Intelligence Agency (CIA). In early November 1975, the Australian Financial Review wrote that Richard Lee Stallings, a former CIA officer, had been channelling money to Anthony, who was a close friend.

Kerr had been involved with a number of CIA fronts. In the 1950s, Kerr had joined the Association for Cultural Freedom, a conservative group which had been established by, and received funding from, the CIA through the Congress for Cultural Freedom. Kerr was on its executive board and wrote for its magazine Quadrant. In  1966, Kerr helped to found Lawasia (or Law Asia), an organization of lawyers which had offices in all the major capitals of Asia. It was funded by The Asia Foundation, a prominent CIA front.

Christopher Boyce, who was convicted of spying for the Soviet Union while an employee of a CIA contractor, said the CIA wanted Whitlam removed from office because he threatened to close US military bases in Australia, including Pine Gap. Boyce said Kerr was described by the CIA as "our man Kerr".

Whitlam later wrote that Kerr did not need any encouragement from the CIA. However, he also said that in 1977 United States Deputy Secretary of State Warren Christopher made a special trip to Sydney to meet with him and told him, on behalf of US President Jimmy Carter, of his willingness to work with whatever government Australians elected, and that the US would never again interfere with Australia's democratic processes.

Former ASIO chief Sir Edward Woodward has dismissed the notion of CIA involvement, as has journalist Paul Kelly. Justice Robert Hope, who had twice been royal commissioner investigating the Australian intelligence agencies, including ASIO, stated in 1998 that he had attempted to locate and interview a witness who had allegedly given in-camera evidence to the Church Committee about CIA involvement in the dismissal. He was unable to find either the witness or testimony, despite having the support of "a senior [US] senator". In his top secret supplementary report, however, Hope dismissed the idea of a CIA involvement in Australian politics.

Return to Opposition, 1975–1978

As the ALP began the 1975 campaign, it seemed that its supporters would maintain their rage. Early rallies drew huge crowds, with attendees handing Whitlam money to pay election expenses. The crowds greatly exceeded those in any of Whitlam's earlier campaigns; in The Domain, Sydney, 30,000 people gathered for an ALP rally below a banner: "Shame Fraser Shame". Fraser's appearances drew protests, and a letter bomb sent to Kerr was defused by authorities. Instead of making a policy speech to keynote his campaign, Whitlam made a speech attacking his opponents and calling 11 November "a day which will live in infamy".

Polls from the first week of campaigning showed a nine-point swing against Labor, which would have decimated Labor if repeated in an election. Whitlam's campaign team disbelieved the results at first, but additional polling returns clearly showed that the electorate had turned against Labor. The Coalition attacked Labor for economic conditions, and released television commercials with the title "The Three Dark Years" showing images from Whitlam government scandals. The ALP campaign concentrated on the issue of Whitlam's dismissal and did not address the economy until its final days. By that time Fraser was confident of victory and content to sit back, avoid specifics and make no mistakes. In the election, the Coalition won the largest majority government in Australian history, winning 91 seats to Labor's 36. Labor suffered a 6.5 per cent swing against it and its caucus was cut almost in half, suffering a 30-seat swing. Labor was left with five fewer seats than it had when Whitlam took the leadership. The Coalition also won a 37–25 majority in the Senate.

Whitlam stayed on as Opposition leader, surviving a leadership challenge. In early 1976, an additional controversy broke when it was reported that Whitlam had been involved in ALP attempts to raise $500,000 during the election from the Ahmed Hassan al-Bakr government of Iraq. No money had actually been paid, and no charges were filed.
The Age printed a cartoon by Peter Nicholson showing the Whitlams huddled together in bed with Margaret Whitlam saying, "Did the earth move for you too, dear?" This cartoon prompted a page full of outraged letters from Labor partisans and a telegram from Gough Whitlam, safe in Tokyo, requesting the original of the cartoon.

In early 1977 Whitlam faced a leadership challenge from Bill Hayden, the last treasurer in the Whitlam government, and won by a two-vote margin. Fraser called an election for 10 December. Although Labor managed to pick up five seats, the Coalition still enjoyed a majority of 48. According to Freudenberg, "The meaning and the message were unmistakable. It was the Australian people's rejection of Edward Gough Whitlam." Whitlam's son Tony, who had joined his father in the House of Representatives at the 1975 election, was defeated. Shortly after the election, Whitlam resigned as party leader and was succeeded by Hayden.

Later years and death, 1978–2014

Whitlam was made a Companion of the Order of Australia in June 1978, and resigned from Parliament on 31 July of the same year. He then held various academic positions. When Labor returned to power under Bob Hawke in 1983, Whitlam was appointed as Australia's ambassador to UNESCO, based in Paris. He served for three years in this post, defending UNESCO against allegations of corruption. At the end of his term as ambassador Whitlam was elected to the Executive Board of UNESCO for a 3-year term, until 1989. In 1985, he was appointed to Australia's Constitutional Commission.

Whitlam was appointed chairman of the National Gallery of Australia in 1987 after his son Nick, who was then managing director of the State Bank of New South Wales, turned down the position. He and Margaret Whitlam were part of the bid team that in 1993 persuaded the International Olympic Committee to give Sydney the right to host the 2000 Summer Olympics.

Sir John Kerr died in 1991. He and Whitlam never reconciled; indeed, Whitlam always saw his dismissal from office as a "constitutional coup d'état". Whitlam and Fraser put aside their differences and became friends during the 1980s, though they never discussed the events of 1975. The two subsequently campaigned together in support of the 1999 Australian republic referendum. In March 2010, Fraser visited Whitlam at his Sydney office while on a book tour to promote his memoirs. Whitlam accepted an autographed copy of the book and presented Fraser with a copy of his 1979 book about the dismissal, The Truth of the Matter.

During the 1990s Labor Government, Whitlam used the Australian Greens as a "decoy questioner" in parliament. According to Dee Margetts, Whitlam "didn't like what Keating and Hawke had done" and regularly sent the Greens questions to ask the government about policies he disagreed with.

Whitlam initially had a close relationship with Labor leader Mark Latham; however, by 2005 he had called for Latham's resignation from parliament. Whitlam called his support of Latham to enter federal politics as one of his "lingering regrets".

Whitlam supported fixed four-year terms for both houses of Parliament. In 2006, he accused the ALP of failing to press for this change. In April 2007, he and Margaret Whitlam were both made life members of the Australian Labor Party. This was the first time anyone had been made a life member of the party organisation at the national level.

In 2007, Whitlam testified at an inquest into the death of Brian Peters, one of five Australia-based TV personnel killed in East Timor in October 1975. Whitlam indicated he had warned Peters' colleague, Greg Shackleton, who was also killed, that the Australian government could not protect them in East Timor and that they should not go there. He also said Shackleton was "culpable" if he had not passed on Whitlam's warning.

Whitlam joined three other former prime ministers in February 2008 in returning to Parliament to witness the Federal Government apology to the Aboriginal Stolen Generations by the then prime minister Kevin Rudd. On 21 January 2009, Whitlam achieved a greater age than any other prime minister of Australia, surpassing the previous record holder Frank Forde. On the 60th anniversary of his marriage to Margaret Whitlam, he called it "very satisfactory" and claimed a record for "matrimonial endurance". In 2010, it was reported that Whitlam had moved into an aged care facility in Sydney's inner east in 2007. Despite this, he continued to go to his office three days a week. Margaret Whitlam remained in the couple's nearby apartment. In early 2012, she suffered a fall there, leading to her death in hospital at the age of 92 on 17 March of that year, a month short of the Whitlams' 70th wedding anniversary.

Gough Whitlam died on the morning of 21 October 2014. His family announced that there would be a private cremation and a public memorial service. Whitlam was survived by his four children, five grandchildren and nine great-grandchildren. He was the longest-lived Australian Prime Minister, dying at the age of 98 years and 102 days. He predeceased his successor Malcolm Fraser (14 years his junior) by just under five months. His funeral was attended by seven Australian prime ministers.

Memorials

A state memorial service was held on 5November 2014 in the Sydney Town Hall and was led by Kerry O'Brien. The Welcome to Country was given by Auntie Millie Ingram and eulogies were delivered by Graham Freudenberg, Cate Blanchett, Noel Pearson, John Faulkner and Antony Whitlam. Pearson's contribution in particular was hailed as "one of the best political speeches of our time". Musical performances were delivered by William Barton (a didgeridoo improvisation), Paul Kelly and Kev Carmody (their land rights protest song From Little Things Big Things Grow), as well as the Sydney Philharmonia Choir and the Sydney Symphony Orchestra, conducted by Benjamin Northey. In accordance with Whitlam's wishes, the orchestra performed "In Tears of Grief" from Bach's St Matthew Passion, "Va, pensiero" from Verdi's Nabucco, "Un Bal" from Symphonie fantastique by Berlioz and, as the final piece, Jerusalem by Parry. Jerusalem was followed by a flypast of four RAAF F/A-18 Hornets in missing man formation. Those attending the memorial included the current and some former governors-general, the current and all living former prime ministers, and members of the family of Vincent Lingiari. The two-hour service, attended by 1,000 invited guests and 900 others, was screened to thousands outside the Hall, as well as in Cabramatta and Melbourne, and broadcast live by ABC television.

In honour of Whitlam, the Australian Electoral Commission created the Division of Whitlam in the House of Representatives in place of the Division of Throsby, with effect from the 2016 election. ACT Chief Minister Katy Gallagher announced that a future Canberra suburb will be named for Whitlam, and that his family would be consulted about other potential memorials. Gough Whitlam Park in Earlwood, New South Wales, is named after him.

In January 2021, the Whitlams' purpose-built home from 1956 to 1978 at 32 Albert Street, Cabramatta, designed by architect Roy Higson Dell Appleton, came up for sale. It was eventually sold at for $1.15 million to a group of Labor supporters, including former NSW Premier Barrie Unsworth, with the intention of restoring the house for educational purposes as a museum.  The work is supported by a Commonwealth government national heritage grant of $1.3 million, and is to be managed by the Whitlam Institute of Western Sydney University. The house was  proposed to be listed as a local heritage item in the Fairfield Local Environmental Plan 2013 as part of a regular LEP review, which identified the house as being at least of state heritage significance. Following renovations and restoration works, the "Whitlam Prime Ministerial Home" was officially opened by Prime Minister Anthony Albanese on 2 December 2022.

Legacy and historical evaluation

Whitlam remains well remembered for the circumstances of his dismissal. It is a legacy he did little to efface; he wrote a 1979 book, The Truth of the Matter (the title is a play on that of Kerr's 1978 memoir, Matters for Judgment), and devoted part of his subsequent book, Abiding Interests, to the circumstances of his removal. According to journalist and author Paul Kelly, who penned two books on the crisis, Whitlam "achieved a paradoxical triumph: the shadow of the dismissal has obscured the sins of his government".

More books have been written about Whitlam, including his own writings, than about any other Australian prime minister. According to Whitlam biographer Jenny Hocking, for a period of at least a decade, the Whitlam era was viewed almost entirely in negative terms, but that has changed. Still, she feels Australians take for granted programmes and policies initiated by the Whitlam government, such as recognition of China, legal aid, and Medicare. Ross McMullin, who wrote an official history of the ALP, notes that Whitlam remains greatly admired by many Labor supporters because of his efforts to reform Australian government, and his inspiring leadership. Some rankings have put Whitlam high on the list of Australia's better prime ministers. Economist and writer Ross Gittins evaluates opinions on the Whitlam Government's responses to the economic challenges of the time:

Wallace Brown describes Whitlam in his book about his experiences covering Australian prime ministers as a journalist:

Whitlam's last words in the documentary film Gough WhitlamIn His Own Words (2002) were in response to a question about his status as an icon and elder statesman. He said:

Published works

 On Australia's Constitution (Melbourne: Widescope, 1977).
 The Truth of the Matter (Melbourne: Melbourne University Press, 1979).
 The Whitlam Government (Ringwood: Viking, 1985).
 Abiding Interests (Brisbane: University of Queensland Press, 1997).
 My Italian Notebook: The Story of an Enduring Love Affair (Sydney: Allen & Unwin, 2002)

See also
 The Hon E.G. Whitlam, painting by Clifton Pugh
 Whitlam Government
 First Whitlam Ministry
 Second Whitlam Ministry
 Third Whitlam Ministry

Notes

References

Citations

Bibliography

External links

 Gough WhitlamAustralia's Prime Ministers / National Archives of Australia
 The Whitlam Institute
 The Whitlam Dismissal11 November 1975
 Dismissal letterCopy of dismissal letter
 Gurindji Land Ceremony Speechtranscript and audio from August 1975
 Listen to an excerpt of Gough Whitlam's 'Kerr's Cur' speech from the National Film and Sound Archive
 "It's Time" speechtranscript
 Whitlam Labor Rally 14 November 1975- Speech held three days after dismissal in King George Square, Brisbane. State Library of Queensland

 
1916 births
2014 deaths
1975 Australian constitutional crisis
Attorneys-General of Australia
Australian barristers
Australian Labor Party members of the Parliament of Australia
Australian Leaders of the Opposition
Australian ministers for Foreign Affairs
Australian King's Counsel
Australian republicans
Australian agnostics
Australian former Christians
Australian social democrats
Companions of the Order of Australia
Honorary Grand Companions of the Order of Logohu
Members of the Australian House of Representatives for Werriwa
Members of the Australian House of Representatives
Members of the Cabinet of Australia
People educated at Canberra Grammar School
People educated at Knox Grammar School
People of the Vietnam War
Permanent Delegates of Australia to UNESCO
Politicians from Melbourne
Prime Ministers of Australia
Recipients of the Centenary Medal
Recipients of the Order of the Rising Sun
Royal Australian Air Force officers
Royal Australian Air Force personnel of World War II
Treasurers of Australia
University of Sydney alumni
Leaders of the Australian Labor Party
Government ministers of Australia
People from Kew, Victoria
People from Canberra
20th-century Australian politicians
20th-century Australian lawyers